Shōrin-ryū (少林流) is one of the major modern Okinawan martial arts and is one of the oldest styles of karate. It was named by Choshin Chibana in 1933, but the system itself is much older. The characters 少林, meaning "sparse" or "scanty" and "forest" respectively and pronounced "shōrin" in Japanese, are also used in the Chinese and Japanese words for Shaolin. "Ryū" means "school".  Shōrin-ryū combines elements of the traditional Okinawan fighting styles of Shuri-te.

History
Chōshin Chibana was a top student of the great master of shuri-te, Ankō Itosu. Ankō Itosu was the top student of Matsumura Sōkon, who was a renowned warrior in his time; bodyguard to three kings of Okinawa, he has been called the Miyamoto Musashi of Okinawa and was dubbed bushi, or warrior, by his king. However, while Sōkon is often referred to as the "founder" of Shuri-te, he did not invent all of its components. Chōshin Chibana never practiced kobudo. In 1933, Chōshin Chibana chose to name his style Shōrin-ryū in honor of its samurai roots and to differentiate it from other styles that were being modified from the original teachings of Ankō Itosu. Generally, Okinawan karate schools did not have individual names for styles like schools in Japan. Several branches of traditional Shōrin-ryū exist today in both Okinawa and the western world. While there is a more concentrated population of practitioners in its birthplace of Okinawa, Shōrin-ryū Karate has had many high dan grades outside Okinawa.

Training 
Shōrin-ryū is generally characterized by natural breathing, natural (narrow, high) stances, and circular, rather than direct movements. Shōrin-ryū practitioners assert that correct motion, moving quickly to evade violence with fluid movements and flexible positions are important, and that a solid structure is vital for powerful blocks and strikes. Stances that are too deep generally make body movement difficult. Another feature in this system is how the student is taught to punch. Generally, there is neither a horizontal nor vertical punch in Shōrin-ryū. Punches are slightly canted to the inside (Isshin-ryū), with the largest knuckle of the forefinger (third from the tip) in vertical alignment with the second knuckle of the pinky finger. It is believed that this position is key in lining up the bones of the arm and creates a faster, more stable and powerful strike.

Kata
Some of the key kata in Shōrin-ryū are:p. 30

These are Series not truly thought of as 'kata'

Fukyu Gata (Popular)
ichi
ni
san (in some schools)
Kihon (Basics)
shodan 
nidan
sandan
yondan
godan

Shōrin-ryū Core Kata
Naihanchi
shodan
nidan
sandan
Pinan
shodan
nidan
sandan
yondan
godan
Passai
sho 
dai 
Gojushiho
Dai Ni Gojushiho
Chinto
Kusanku
sho
dai
Jion

The following Kata are not taught in all Shōrin-ryū systems or dojo 
Seisan
Ananku
Wankan
Rohai
Wanshu
Gorin
Koryu Passai
Teesho
Ryuko

The study of weapons only starts at dan-level, and weapon kata are not standardised across the style.p. 45. While this maybe true with some Dojos it is not true with all. In many Shorin-ryu dojos Kobudo (Weapons training) is started after the yellow belt.

Branches
  Shūgorō Nakazato Shūgorō Nakazato (仲里 周五郎 Nakazato Shūgorō?, August 14, 1920 – August 24, 2016)
  Shorin-Ryu Reihokan Naonobu Ahagon
 Shōrin-ryū Shidōkan normally called Shidōkan or Okinawan Shidōkan
 Shorinkan
 Shorinkan USA Lineage 
 Shōrin-ryū Seibukan
 Matsubayashi-ryū
 Shōrin-ryū Kokau
 Shōrin-ryū Kyudōkan normally called Kyudōkan
 Oshukai
 Chubu Shōrin-ryū
 Shōrin-ryū (Shaolin) also known as Shobayashi.
 Ryukyu Shōrin-ryū
 Kobayashi Shōrin-ryū
 Kyobukan Shōrin-ryū
 Matsumura Kenpo Shōrin-ryū
 Matsumura Seito Hakutsuru Shōrin-ryū
 Matsumura Shōrin-ryū
 Jyoshinmon Shōrin-ryū
 Shima-ha Shōrin-ryū
 Yoshudokai Shorin-ryu

Ranks
In 1924, Gichin Funakoshi, a contemporary of Chibana sensei and also a disciple of Ankō Itosu, adopted the Dan system from judo founder Kanō Jigorō using a rank scheme with a limited set of belt colors to promote Karate-Do among the Japanese. In 1960, this practice was also adopted in Okinawa.

In a Kyū/Dan system, the beginner grade is a higher-numbered kyū (e.g., 7th Kyū) and progress is toward a lower-numbered Kyū. The Dan progression continues from 1st Dan (Shodan, or 'beginning dan') to the higher dan grades. Kyū-grade karateka are referred to as "color belt" or mudansha ("ones without dan"); Dan-grade karateka are referred to as yudansha (holders of dan rank). Yudansha typically wear a black belt.

Requirements of rank differ among styles, organizations, and schools. Kyū ranks gradually stress proper stances, balance, motion and coordination. Speed, timing, focus and power are examined at higher grades. Minimum age and time in rank are factors affecting promotion. Testing consists of demonstration of technique before a panel of examiners. Black belt testing is commonly done in a manner known as shinsa, which includes a written examination as well as demonstration of kihon, kumite, kata, and bunkai (applications of technique).

In Shōrin-ryū, one possible rank (belt) progression is listed below:  There are many others.  For instance, the largest organization in North America does not use yellow, orange, blue, or purple belts.:  Nor are the colors or orders consistent from school to school within an organization.

In the US, the mudansha may vary by style but in general are:

White Belt  (8th Kyū)
Yellow Belt (7th Kyū)
Orange Belt (6th Kyū)
Blue Belt (5th Kyū)
Green Belt   (4th Kyū)
Purple Belt  (3rd Kyū)
Brown Belt (2nd Kyū)
Black Belt  (1st Kyū)

In the Matsumura Seito style, the belts are:

White
White with a Yellow Stripe
Yellow
Yellow with a Green Stripe
Green
Green with a Blue Stripe
Blue
Blue with a Brown Stripe
Brown (Kobudo also starts here)
Brown with a Black Stripe
Black (Shodan)

In the USA some of the styles' yudansha follow this system:

Black Belt (1st to 3rd Dan)
Master Level
Red and Black Checkered Belt (4th to 5th Dan)
Red and White Checkered Belt (6th to 8th Dan)
Red Belt (9th to 10th Dan)
Note:  The Beikoku Shidokan Association follows the Judo yudansha belt system:

Black Belt for 1st through 6th Dan

Red and White Checkered/paneled Belt for 7th and 8th Dan

Red Belt for 9th and 10th Dan.

Notable practitioners 

 Chosin Chibana (founder)
 Kentsu Yabu
 Hanshi Rick Moore (10th Dan martial artist)
 Joe Lewis (martial artist)
 Mike Stone (karate)
 Bill Wallace (martial artist)
 Jim Kelly (martial artist)
 Shūgorō Nakazato
 John Corcoran (martial arts)
 Tiffany van Soest
 Matt Larsen
 Tadashi Yamashita
 Rina Takeda
 Yukio Sakaguchi
 Leo Howard
 Chris Casamassa
 Katsuya Miyahira
 Higa Yuchoku
 Ankichi Arakaki
 Eizo Shimabukuro
 Katalin Zamiar
 Ciriaco Cañete
 Robert John Burke
 Larry Belangia Jr
 James Hawkes
 Tim Vandenover

Notes

References

 
 
Japanese martial arts